Braljina may refer to:

 Braljina (Ćićevac), a village in Serbia
 Braljina (Ražanj), a village in Serbia